Starksia starcki, the key blenny, is a species of labrisomid blenny native to the Caribbean Sea. This species can reach a length of  TL. It is also found in the aquarium trade. The specific name honours the Walter A Starck II in recognition of his contributions to marine biology.

References

starcki
Fish described in 1971